Tang-e Ban (also known as Bejak-e Bon) is a village in Tashan-e Sharqi Rural District, Tashan District, Behbahan County, Khuzestan Province, Iran. At the 2006 census, its population was 45, in 9 families.

References 

Populated places in Behbahan County